The 1988–89 Washington Capitals season saw the team became the first team other than the Philadelphia Flyers or the New York Islanders to finish in first place in the Patrick Division with a 41–29–10 record for 92 points.  However, they lost their first-round playoff match-up to the Philadelphia Flyers, four games to two. This was the first time the Capitals won their division in the regular season and did not do so again until 2000.

Regular season

The Capitals tied the St. Louis Blues for most shutouts in the league, with 6.

Final standings

Schedule and results

Playoffs

Round 1: (P1) Washington Capitals vs. (P4) Philadelphia Flyers

Player statistics

Regular season
Scoring

Goaltending

Playoffs
Scoring

Goaltending

Note: GP = Games played; G = Goals; A = Assists; Pts = Points; +/- = Plus/minus; PIM = Penalty minutes; PPG=Power-play goals; SHG=Short-handed goals; GWG=Game-winning goals
      MIN=Minutes played; W = Wins; L = Losses; T = Ties; GA = Goals against; GAA = Goals against average; SO = Shutouts; SA=Shots against; SV=Shots saved; SV% = Save percentage;

Awards and records

Transactions

Draft picks
Washington's draft picks at the 1988 NHL Entry Draft held at the Montreal Forum in Montreal, Quebec.

Farm teams

References

Washington Capitals seasons
Wash
Wash
Patrick Division champion seasons
Washing
Washing